Prikubansky (masculine), Prikubanskaya (feminine), or Prikubanskoye (neuter) is the name of several rural localities in Russia:
Prikubansky, Republic of Adygea, a settlement in Takhtamukaysky District of the Republic of Adygea, 
Prikubansky, Anapsky District, Krasnodar Krai, a khutor in Pervomaysky Rural Okrug of Anapsky District of Krasnodar Krai
Prikubansky, Krasnoarmeysky District, Krasnodar Krai, a khutor in Novomyshastovsky Rural Okrug of Krasnoarmeysky District of Krasnodar Krai, 
Prikubansky, Novokubansky District, Krasnodar Krai, a settlement in Prikubansky Rural Okrug of Novokubansky District of Krasnodar Krai, 
Prikubansky, Anastasiyevsky Rural Okrug, Slavyansky District, Krasnodar Krai, a khutor in Anastasiyevsky Rural Okrug of Slavyansky District of Krasnodar Krai, 
Prikubansky, Prikubansky Rural Okrug, Slavyansky District, Krasnodar Krai, a khutor in Prikubansky Rural Okrug of Slavyansky District of Krasnodar Krai,

See also
Prikubansky (disambiguation)

References

Notes

Sources

